

1848

Circulating coins

1892

Non-circulating coins

1893

Non-circulating coins

1899

Non-circulating coins

Notes 
  The 1848 "CAL" quarter eagle was not popular with numismatists, and all unsold coins were placed into circulation.  The coin commemorated the California Gold Rush.

References 

Commemorative coins of the United States